Anna Thangi is an Indian Kannada language soap opera airing on Udaya TV. The show premiered on 22 November 2021. It stars Madhu Sagar and Akhila Dechamma in lead roles. The series is an official remake of Tamil language serial Vanathai Pola.

Plot
Shivaraju and Tulasi are siblings who lose their parents at a young age. They will go to any lengths for each other. Though Tulasi is in love with Abhishek, she agrees to her brother's wish in marriage. The stirring tale of this doting brother and sister forms the crux of the story.

Cast

Main
Madhu Sagar as Shivaraju
Akhila Dechamma as Tulasi

Supporting
Mansi Joshi / Jessica as Sandhya
Rajesh Dhruva / Yadu Shreshtha as Abhishek 
Swaraj Shetty / Prajwal Ravi as Indra
Radha Ramachandra
Rohith Nagesh
Sharmita
Girish Jatti
Tanuja

Production

Casting
Madhu Sagar was selected to portray the lead role as Shivaraju. Akhila Dechamma made her television acting debut with the series by playing another lead role as Thulasi. Mansi Joshi was selected in a supporting role but later was replaced by Jessica. Meanwhile Rajesh Dhruva was cast in supporting role who made his comeback with the series but was later replaced actor Yadu Shreshtha.

Adaptations

References

2021 Indian television series debuts
Kannada-language television shows
Udaya TV original programming
Kannada-language television series based on Tamil-language television series